Honea Path is a town primarily in Anderson County, South Carolina and extending into Abbeville County in the northwest part of the state. The population was 3,597 at the 2010 census.

Geography
Honea Path is located at  (34.447400, -82.393044).

Honea Path has many lakes and creeks: towards Anderson on Highway 252 is Blue Barker Creek (aka, Blue Creek) and Barkers Creek, and towards Princeton on Highway 76 is Broad Mouth Creek.

Demographics

2020 census

As of the 2020 United States census, there were 3,686 people, 1,465 households, and 1,027 families residing in the town.

2000 census
As of the census of 2000, there were 3,504 people, 1,535 households, and 1,037 families residing in the town. The population density was 1,004.1 people per square mile (387.7/km2). There were 1,681 housing units at an average density of 481.7 per square mile (186.0/km2). The racial makeup of the town was 79.02% White, 19.55% African American, 0.17% Native American, 0.20% Asian, 0.06% Pacific Islander, 0.26% from other races, and 0.74% from two or more races. Hispanic or Latino of any race were 1.00% of the population.

There were 1,535 households, out of which 25.0% had children under the age of 18 living with them, 45.5% were married couples living together, 18.2% had a female householder with no husband present, and 32.4% were non-families. 30.2% of all households were made up of individuals, and 16.9% had someone living alone who was 65 years of age or older. The average household size was 2.25 and the average family size was 2.75.

In the town, the population was spread out, with 21.8% under the age of 18, 7.9% from 18 to 24, 23.5% from 25 to 44, 24.5% from 45 to 64, and 22.3% who were 65 years of age or older. The median age was 42 years. For every 100 females, there were 84.5 males. For every 100 females age 18 and over, there were 81.6 males.

The median income for a household in the town was $30,938, and the median income for a family was $38,980. Males had a median income of $28,635 versus $24,107 for females. The per capita income for the town was $17,643. About 10.9% of families and 14.9% of the population were below the poverty line, including 16.5% of those under age 18 and 21.4% of those age 65 or over.

History 
The Chiquola textile mill was very important in Honea Path's early development. On September 6, 1934, management perpetrated the Chiquola Mill Massacre against workers taking part in a general textile strike.  Textile factory guards killed six picketers and injured approximately thirty more in the altercation. The men were reported to have been shot fleeing the picket lines, and many were found with bullet wounds in their backs. This event is featured in the Public Broadcasting Service (PBS) documentary on the POV series called "The Uprising of '34".  An historical photo essay entitled "Mill Town Murder" is online at Beacham Journal . Here: https://www.beachamjournal.com/journal/2014/08/its-the-80th-anniversary-of-the-chiquola-mill-massacre-in-honea-path-south-carolina.html

The Obediah Shirley House was listed on the National Register of Historic Places in 1999.

Education
Public education in Honea Path is administered by Anderson School District Two. The district operates  Honea Path Elementary School, Honea Path Middle School, and Belton-Honea Path High School. Whispering Pines Mennonite School is a private institution.

Honea Path has a public library, a branch of the Anderson County Library System.

References

External links
 Town of Honea Path official website
 Honea Path Heritage Corridor marker

Towns in South Carolina
Towns in Abbeville County, South Carolina
Towns in Anderson County, South Carolina